Marcelo Gonçalves de Oliveira (born April 17, 1971 in São Paulo), known as Piracaia,  is a Brazilian football player. He currently plays and works as an assistant coach for the Finnish second-tier club Musan Salama.

Piracaia has played 17 seasons and 324 matches in Finnish Veikkausliiga. In the six games of the 1998–99 UEFA Champions League group stage he was in the opening line-up of HJK Helsinki. Piracaia has also played in the top divisions of Sweden, Algeria and Tunisia.

Honours 
Club:
Finnish championship: 1993, 1996
Swedish championship: 1998
Finnish Cup winner: 1998
Personal:
Ilta-Sanomat Player of the Year Award: 1993

statistics 
with USM Blida 
2000-2001 : (22 matches, 3 goal, 6 assists)
2001-2002 : (28 matches, 1 goals, 15 assists)

References

External links

1971 births
Brazilian footballers
Veikkausliiga players
Allsvenskan players
Algerian Ligue Professionnelle 1 players
FC Jazz players
Helsingin Jalkapalloklubi players
AIK Fotboll players
US Monastir (football) players
USM Blida players
Living people
Brazilian expatriate sportspeople in Algeria
Kotkan Työväen Palloilijat players
Brazilian expatriate footballers
Expatriate footballers in Finland
Expatriate footballers in Sweden
Expatriate footballers in Algeria
Association football midfielders
Musan Salama players
Footballers from São Paulo